A rustico (plural: rustici) is a snack in the southern Italian region of Salento made with puff pastry and stuffings that vary by style. A common preparation uses puff pastry, tomato, and mozzarella. It is part of the Salentine street food tradition and can be found in every Apulian bar, bakery, and rotisserie.

It is produced with two discs of puff pastry, the lower disk is of about 10 cm (approximately 4 inch) in diameter and the upper one of 12 cm (about 5 inch), to which adds cheese and tomato. Then it is brushed with egg and baked in the oven. It should be eaten warm to best appreciate the taste and the melted mozzarella. 

In Salento it is usually eaten as a mid-morning or evening snack, both in summer and winter. The wurstel variant of the pastry is the best known in Salento as well as Northern Italy as a whole (perhaps due Austrian culinary influence).

See also
 List of pastries
 List of stuffed dishes

References

Italian cuisine
Stuffed dishes
Street food in Italy